Garrow may refer to:

Garrows are a group of people from India
Garrow (Inheritance Cycle), is a minor character from the fantasy series The Inheritance Cycle
Garrow, Perth and Kinross, a village in Perth and Kinross, Scotland

Surname 
 Alex Garrow (1923–1966), 20th-century Scottish politician
 David Garrow (born 1953), American historian
 James Mitchell Ellis Garrow (1865–1935), New Zealand lawyer and university professor
 James Thompson Garrow (1843–1916), Ontario lawyer
 John Garrow (1929–2016), British nutritionist
 Nathaniel Garrow (1780–1841), 19th-century American politician
 Robert Garrow (1936–1978), American spree killer
 William Garrow (1760–1840), English lawyer of the late 18th and early 19th century